General Lionel Piyananda Balagalle RWP, RSP, VSV, USP, VSP was a senior Sri Lankan army officer. He served as Commander of the Sri Lanka Army and Chief of the Defence Staff.

Early life and education
Born in Colombo, both his parents were teachers. Having received his primary education in a rural school in Ratnapura, he attended Ananda College for his secondary education, he excelled in sports winning college colours. He was a senior school prefect and a cadet.

Military career

Early career
Balagalle studied medicine before he joined the Ceylon Army as an Officer Cadet on 5 April 1965. Receiving his basic training at the Army Training Centre, Diyatalawa, he was commissioned as a second lieutenant in the 4th Regiment, Ceylon Artillery on 5 April 1967. As an artillery officer he took part in counter insurgency operations in the 1971 JVP Insurrection and later attended the Indian Army School of Artillery in Deolali from September 1971 to February 1972 for the Young Officers Course. He returned to Deolali from August 1977 to September 1978 for the Long Gunnery Staff Officers Course and qualified as an Instructor Gunnery (IG).

Military intelligence
Having attended the Intelligence Staff Officers Course in Pune from August 1975 to October 1975, Balagalle served as a General Staff Officer (intelligence) and in the 1980s initiated the formal military intelligence operations while serving as the General Staff Officer (Grade 1) and thereafter the Principal Staff Officer of the Joint Operations Command with the rank of major. Here he played a major role in planning the Vadamarachchi Operation and subduing the 1987–1989 JVP insurrection. He attended the Intelligence Security Administration Course in the United Kingdom in September 1989. Balagalle became the first Director of Military Intelligence and Commanding Officer of the Military Intelligence Corps, serving from 1990 to 1994 with the rank of lieutenant colonel.

Higher command
He had served as Brigade Commander of the 4 Brigade and the Artillery Brigade as well as Area Headquarters Wanni (1994). From January 1996 to December 1996, he attended the National Defence College. Promoted to major general, Balagalle served as General Officer Commanding, Task Force 2 (for Elephant Pass, Pooneryn, Mullaitivu and Vavuniya areas), 51 Division. He then served as Commander Security Forces Headquarters – Jaffna and Commander Security Forces Headquarters – Wanni. In latter role, he conduced several offensive operations code named Rivibala (1998) and Ranagosha 1-4 (1999). Returning to Army Headquarters, he served as Deputy Chief of Staff and thereafter Chief of Staff of the Army. He was also the Colonel Commandant of Military Intelligence Corps (1997 - 1998).

Commander of the Army and CDS
On 24 August 2000, he succeeded General Srilal Weerasooriya as Commander of the Sri Lankan Army and was promoted to the rank of lieutenant general. He was the first officer cadet to be trained locally at the Army Training Center to become the commander of the army. During his tenure the army began deploying troops for United Nations peace keeping operations and established the Institute of Peace Support Operations Training in Kukuleganga in conjunction with the US Army Pacific Command. On the Army day, 10 October 2003, he was received concurrent appointment as Chief of the Defence Staff (CDS). He was the first serving Army Commander in the country to hold the post of CDS. During his tenure he was the first foreign military chief to visit the line of control after the ceasefire agreement between Pakistan and India was signed as well attended the sixth Chiefs of Defence Staff Conference in Hawaii and the fifth Chiefs of Defence Conference in Singapore. He was succeeded by Lieutenant General Shantha Kottegoda on 30 June as Commander of the Army. He continued as CDS until his retirement in 1 September 2005, with the rank of general.

Family
General Balagalle married to his wife Gnana and has three children. His son Lakmal Balagalle was also an artillery officer.

Decorations 
His military decorations include the Rana Wickrama Padakkama and the Rana Sura Padakkama for gallantry; the distinguished service medals, Vishista Seva Vibhushanaya, Uttama Seva Padakkama, Videsha Seva Padakkama and the Sri Lanka Armed Services Long Service Medal and Clasp; campaign medals Vadamarachchi Operation Medal, Riviresa Campaign Services Medal, Purna Bhumi Padakkama, and the North and East Operations Medal with Clasp. He has also received the President's Inauguration Medal, 50th Independence Anniversary Commemoration Medal, Sri Lanka Army Volunteer Force Centenary Medal.

References

External links
Lionel Balagalle at Outlook India

|-

|-

1947 births
Living people
Commanders of the Sri Lanka Army
Sri Lankan full generals
Sinhalese military personnel
Sri Lanka Artillery officers
Military Intelligence Corps officers
Alumni of Ananda College
Sri Lanka Military Academy graduates
National Defence College, India alumni